Nicolás Sorin is a film composer and producer. He works in the cinema of Argentina.

Sorin started his music career at Berklee College of Music where he studies with Bob Brookmeyer, Maria Schneider and Vuk Kulenovic.

In a brief period of time his music was being performed throughout the United States and Europe by Symphonic Orquestras and Big Bands. At 21 he was awarded the “Premio Cóndor” and the “Premio Clarín” for the music score of the film Historias Minimas as well as two nominations for the Latin Grammys 2007 and 2010 as a producer.

He has worked in Europe with artists such as Miguel Bosé, Victor Manuel and Chris Cameron and has conducted prestigious orchestras such as the London Session Orchestra, the Mexico Symphony Orchestra and the Henry Mancini Orchestra, among others.

Filmography
 Historias mínimas (2002)  Minimal Stories
 El Perro (2004) a.k.a. Bombón: El Perro
 El Camino de San Diego (2006) a.k.a. The Road to San Diego
 La Ventana (Carlos Sorin) 2008
 Yo, una Historia de Amor Theatre (Diego Reinhold) 2011
 El Gato Desaparece 2011 a.k.a. The Cat Vanishes
 Días de Pesca 2012 a.k.a. Gone Fishing
 Verdades Verdaderas (N.Gil Laavedra) 2011

Discography
 Mini Buda - Octafonic (Composer, Producer & Arranger) 2016
 La Rueda de la Fortuna - Pajaro de Fuego (Performer) 2014
 Monster - Octafonic (Composer, Producer & Arranger) 2012
 Papitwo - Miguel Bosé (producer-arranger) 2012
Estaciones porteñas - Piazzolla electrónico (keyboards) 2012
Indisciplína - Mariana Bianchini (arranger) 2012
Pajaro de Fuego - Esteban Sehinkman (singer) 2012
Volume II - Ensamble Real Book (producer-arranger) 2011
Nilda Fernández- Nilda Fernández (producer-arranger) 2011
Triumph - Ferenc Nemeth (arranger) 2011
 Cardio - Miguel Bosé (composer -producer) 2010
Jauría - Jauría (arranger) 2010
Les Amateurs - Les Amateurs (keyboards) 2009
Cosmopolitan - Sorin Octeto (composer -producer-arranger) 2008
 Papito - Miguel Bosé (producer-arranger) 2007
Flan - Elbou (composer-producer-arranger) 2006
Roots Time Soundtrack (composer -arranger) 2006
 Velvetina - Miguel Bosé (arranger) 2005
Amerique Latine - Musique & Cinema du Monde (composer) 2004
Neruda en el corazón - Victor Manuel (producer-arranger) 2004
Por vos Muero - Miguel Bosé (producer-arranger) 2004
Discover - Berklee College of Music (composer) 2002
Encore Gala - Berklee College of Music (composer) 2001

References

External links
 
 NicolasSorin.com

Argentine film score composers
Male film score composers
Living people
Year of birth missing (living people)
Place of birth missing (living people)